Stefanos Kapino (born 18 March 1994) is a Greek professional footballer who plays as a goalkeeper for Ekstraklasa club Miedź Legnica and the Greece national team.

Early life
Stefanos was born in Piraeus to a family who came to Greece from Albania (Northern Epirus). He began playing football in the youth system of the amateur club Aetos based in Korydallos, Piraeus.
At Panathinaikos, he gradually established himself as a member of the starting lineup for the club's under-18 and under-21 teams.

Club career

Panathinaikos
On 17 September 2011, during a Super League match against Atromitos, Kapino made his debut for Panathinaikos' men's team, coming on as a substitute after his teammate Orestis Karnezis was sent off. With that appearance, he became the youngest goalkeeper to ever play for Panathinaikos, at the age of 17 years, six months and nine days. He went on to play the following 11 matches, finishing his first season with 12 appearances.

The 2012–13 season saw Panathinaikos use four different managers – Jesualdo Ferreira, the Argentine Juan Ramón Rocha, Spanish Fabri and finally Giannis Vonortas – while the club finished sixth in the league. Kapino was limited to one appearances, in a home 3–2 win against Veria.

In summer 2013 he was linked with Arsenal, Inter Milan and Manchester United and it was reported a move to Napoli had broken down. The 2013–14 season proved to be Kapino's best season at Panathinaikos. He started as regular to most of the Super League games and as a consequence was selected for the final squad of the 2014 World Cup.

Mainz 05
In 2014, Kapino moved to German Bundesliga side Mainz 05 for a transfer fee of reportedly €2.2 million and signed a four-year contract until 2018. He had to compete with Loris Karius for a spot in the starting grid. He made his Bundesliga debut on 7 February 2015 at home versus Hertha BSC as a 34th minute replacement for Christian Clemens after the starting goalkeeper Loris Karius was given a red card for a foul on the last man.

Olympiacos
After one year with Mainz, during which he could not establish himself, Kapino moved back to his native Greece to join Olympiacos, rivals of his former club Panathinaikos, on a three-year deal for a transfer of believed to be €2 million.

He made his Greek Super League debut for Olympiacos on 21 March 2016 away to Asteras Tripolis. He was part of the starting XI of the squad in the 2015–16 Greek Football Cup season, except in the final where Olympiacos were defeated by rivals AEK Athens in an empty Olympic Stadium.

On 27 July 2016, Kapino made his first European appearance with the club in the 3rd qualifying round of UEFA Champions League against the Israeli champions Hapoel Be'er Sheva He started the 2016–17 season as the indisputable first goalkeeper of the club. On 6 November 2016, he suffered a muscular injury during the second half of the 3–0 home win in the derby against Panathinaikos and was substituted by Nicola Leali. The injury would keep him on the sidelines for three to four weeks ruling him out of the Greece squad to face Belarus and Bosnia.

On 19 March 2017, Kapino returned to action following his replacement Leali's mistakes in two Europa League matches against Besiktas
making saves that prevented a bigger defeat for Olympiacos in an away 1–0 derby loss against rivals Panathinaikos.

He started the 2017–18 season as the undisputed first goalkeeper of the club, despite the acquisition of ex-Belgian international Silvio Proto.

On 24 September 2017, Kapino was demoted to the club's U-20 squad ahead of an important UEFA Champions League game against Juventus following mistakes in the team's 3–2 Super League away loss against rivals AEK Athens after leading 0–2. This proved to be the last league game for Kapino who, after also appearing and underperforming in two Greek Cup fixtures, was put on the out-of-favour player list by Olympiacos on 4 December 2017. He was unable to find a club to continue his career after the end of the January 2018 transfer window, leading the Olympiacos board to the termination of his contract and his release on a free transfer.

Nottingham Forest
On 7 February 2018, days before the end of the transfer window for unattached players, Kapino signed with EFL Championship side Nottingham Forest, under the presidency of chairman Evangelos Marinakis, on an 18-month deal. On 21 April 2018, he made his debut with the club as a starter, in a 2–1 away loss against Cardiff City.

Werder Bremen
On 1 August 2018, Kapino joined Bundesliga side Werder Bremen for an undisclosed fee. According to media reports, he signed a contract until 2020 with an option of a further year while the transfer fee paid to Nottingham Forest was estimated at €300,000 which could rise up to €1 million depending on bonuses. A week later, he suffered an injury which could rule him out for three months. On 19 January 2019, he sat on the bench for the first time in a 1–0 home win against Hannover 96. On 13 April 2019, he made his debut with the club replacing the injured Jiří Pavlenka in the second half of a 2–1 Bundesliga home win game against SC Freiburg.

In July 2019, Kapino agreed a contract extension with the club. On 7 March 2019, almost a year since his last appearance as a starter, Kapino was in the starting XI replacing Pavlenka, who had been injured midweek.

Kapino joined 2. Bundesliga club SV Sandhausen on loan for the rest of the season in January 2021.

Arminia Bielefeld
Kapino moved to Bundesliga club Arminia Bielefeld for an undisclosed fee in August 2021, having agreed a contract until 2023. On 18 December, after regular goalkeeper Stefan Ortega had to self-quarantine after testing positive to COVID-19, Kapino played in a 2-0 away victory against RB Leipzig, in his club effort to avoid relegation.

Miedź Legnica
On 22 January 2023, Kapino had his Arminia Bielefeld contract terminated by mutual consent, subsequently joining Ekstraklasa club Miedź Legnica.

International career
Kapino due to being born in Greece was eligible to represent Greece and his Albanian heritage made him eligible for Albania, and he has been a member of the Greece under-17 and under-19 teams. He is the youngest player to ever play for Greece U17, having debuted at the age of 15.

On 15 November 2011, at the age of 17 years and 241 days, he made his debut for the men's national team in a friendly match against Romania, thus setting a new record for the youngest player ever to represent Greece at men's level.

Stefanos was member to the 23-man squad for 2014 FIFA World Cup in Brazil as third choice goalkeeper along with Orestis Karnezis and Panagiotis Glykos.

On 4 June 2016, Kapino came on as a first half substitute for injured first choice goalkeeper Orestis Karnezis and despite conceding a late goal, produced a stunning display for his adopted country making many world class saves in Greece's 1–0 away International Friendly defeat to Australia at Stadium Australia in Sydney.

On 25 March 2017, replacing injured Orestis Karnezis in a crucial 2018 FIFA World Cup qualification away match against Belgium did brilliantly throughout the game and especially at the extra time as he prevent Romelu Lukaku from scoring the winner from point-blank range  with a brilliant double save, helping Greece to save the defeat in its effort to qualify for 2018 World Cup.

Career statistics

Club

International

Honours
Panathinaikos
 Greek Cup: 2013–14

Olympiacos
 Super League: 2015–16, 2016–17

Greece U19
UEFA European Under-19 Championship runner-up:2012
Individual
UEFA European Under-19 Championship Team of the Tournament: 2011

References

External links

1994 births
Living people
Footballers from Piraeus
Greek people of Albanian descent
Association football goalkeepers
Greek footballers
Greece youth international footballers
Greece under-21 international footballers
Greece international footballers
Greek expatriate footballers
2014 FIFA World Cup players
Super League Greece players
English Football League players
Bundesliga players
2. Bundesliga players
Panathinaikos F.C. players
1. FSV Mainz 05 players
Olympiacos F.C. players
Nottingham Forest F.C. players
SV Werder Bremen players
SV Sandhausen players
Arminia Bielefeld players
Miedź Legnica players
Expatriate footballers in Germany
Greek expatriate sportspeople in Germany
Expatriate footballers in Poland
Greek expatriate sportspeople in Poland
Expatriate footballers in England
Greek expatriate sportspeople in England